The FIM Asia Road Racing Championship (known as Idemitsu FIM Asia Road Racing Championship for sponsorship reason) is the regional motorcycle road racing championship for Asia, held since 1996.

This championship is part of the production-based category of racing, similar to the Supersport World Championship, British Supersport Championship, AMA Supersport Championship and Australian Supersport Championship. Modified versions of road-going motorcycles available to the public are featured in the race.

The championship is currently divided into four open-make classes - the ASB1000 (Asia Superbikes), SuperSports 600cc, Asia Production 250cc and Underbone 150cc. The new Asian Superbikes class revived off in 2019.

Overview 
The Asia Road Racing Championship was first organized in 1996 as part of an Asian-wide initiative boost the development of the sport of motorcycle racing in the continent. The championship received the endorsement of the Fédération Internationale de Motocyclisme (FIM, "International Motorcycling Federation") in 1997 and has been recognized since as the Asian continental championship for the FIM.

The commercial rights are owned by Two Wheels Motor Racing, with FIM Asia as the sports sanctioning body.

The 2020 season consists of seven rounds with two races organized per round.

Circuits 
The championship tours in Asia but is open to riders from all nationalities.

The Asia Road Racing 2023 season consists of 6 races at 6 circuits in 5 Asian countries.

 Round 1, March 24–26, 2023, Thailand, Chang International Circuit
 Round 2, May 12–14, 2023, Malaysia, Sepang International Circuit
 Round 3, June 23–25, 2023, Japan, Sportsland Sugo
 Round 4, August 11–13, 2023, Indonesia, Mandalika International Street Circuit
 Round 5, Octember 6–8, 2023, China, Zhuhai International Circuit
 Round 6, December 1–3, 2023, Thailand, Chang International Circuit

Other venues that had previously hosted the Asia Road Racing Championship included:

 Shah Alam, Malaysia, Shah Alam Circuit (1996, 2001–2002)
 Pasir Gudang, Malaysia, Johor Circuit (1996–2004, 2006, 2008, 2016–2017)
 Bogor, Indonesia, Sentul International Circuit (1996–2000, 2002–2018)
 Nakhonchaisee, Thailand, Thailand Circuit (1996–2001)
 Batangas, Philippines, Batangas Racing Circuit (1996)
 Subic Bay, Philippines, Subic International Raceway (1997)
 Tailem Bend, Australia, The Bend Motorsport Park (2018–2019)
 Chennai (Madras), India, Madras International Circuit (1997, 2009–2011, 2013, 2017–2018)
 New Delhi, India, Buddh International Circuit (2016)
 Fukuoka, Japan, Autopolis (2009–2014)
 Doha, Qatar, Losail International Circuit (2010–2015)
 Donggang, Taiwan, Penbay International Circuit (2012)
 Suzuka, Japan, Suzuka International Racing Course (2013–2019)

2020 race classes and motorcycles

Current broadcasters

Worldwide 
Live coverage, on-demand, and highlights for free practices, qualifications, and races is available on Asia Road Racing Championship's official Facebook page and Youtube channel, as well as Bikeandrace.com.

Asia-Pacific

Spain (the one and only European country) 
All races are streamed through subscription service DAZN.

Winners by race class

1996–1999 
The road racing series began on 2-stroke engines.

2000–2003 
The gradual shift to 4-stroke engines began in 2000 when the SuperSports 600cc class replaced the previous 250cc bikes as the premier class of the championship.

2004–2005

2006–2014

2015–2018

2019–2021

2022

Notable achievements 
The Asia Road Racing Championship is a mix of well-known riders racing against upcoming talents from the Asian region. Some of the big names that have contributed to the growth of the sport of road racing in Asia include Katsuaki Fujiwara, Ryuichi Kiyonari, Yuki Takahashi and Noriyuki Haga. In 2016, Anthony West was the latest addition in the roster of internationally recognized names. For the 2019 season, Australian racers who have participated in both MotoGP and World Superbike take part in the series, they are Broc Parkes, and Bryan Staring.

This formula of pitting upcoming talents against seasoned campaigners have resulted in a number of successes. In recent years, riders from the Asian region are beginning to make their breakthrough into the MotoGP arena. These include:
 Shahrol Yuzy Ahmad Zaini (250cc, 1996 to 2002)
 Azlan Shah Kamaruzaman (Moto2, 2013 to 2015)
 Hafizh Syahrin Abdullah (Moto2, 2011 to 2017; MotoGP, 2018 to present)
 Thitipong Warokorn (Moto2, 2013 to 2015)
 Rafid Topan Sucipto (Moto2, 2012–13, 2018)
 Doni Tata Pradita (GP250cc, 2008; and Moto2, 2013)
 Dimas Ekky Pratama (Moto2, 2019)
 Khairul Idham Pawi (Moto3, 2016; Moto2, 2017 to present)
 Hiroki Ono (Moto3, 2013 to 2016)

On July 4 to 11, 2016, five young riders from the Asia Production 250cc class became the first batch of riders to be trained at the VR46 Academy in Italy as part of the Yamaha|VR46 Master Camp. They were Peerapong Loiboonpeng (21, Thailand), Imanuel Putra Pratna (19, Indonesia), Galang Hendra Pratama (17, Indonesia), Soichiro Minamimoto (16, Japan) and Kasma Daniel Kasmayudin (16, Malaysia).

See also
 Asia-Pacific Rally Championship

References

External links 

https://asiaroadracing.com/results/
http://www.fim-publicaffairs.com/

 
Motorcycle road racing series
Recurring sporting events established in 1996